Dicranosepsis is a genus of flies in the family Sepsidae.

Species
Dicranosepsis barbata Iwasa, 2008
Dicranosepsis bicolor (Wiedemann, 1830)
Dicranosepsis biformis Iwasa, 2012
Dicranosepsis breviappendiculata (Meijere, 1913)
Dicranosepsis cavernosa Iwasa, 1999
Dicranosepsis coryphea Steyskal, 1966
Dicranosepsis crinita (Duda, 1926)
Dicranosepsis distincta Iwasa & Tewari, 1991
Dicranosepsis dudai Ozerov, 2003
Dicranosepsis emiliae Ozerov, 1992
Dicranosepsis hamata (Meijere, 1911)
Dicranosepsis iwasai Ozerov, 1997
Dicranosepsis javanica (Meijere, 1904)
Dicranosepsis kaloedka Ozerov & Krivosheina, 2011
Dicranosepsis kurahashii Iwasa, 2008
Dicranosepsis longa Iwasa, 2008
Dicranosepsis maculosa Iwasa, 1984
Dicranosepsis mirabilis Iwasa, 1999
Dicranosepsis monoseta Iwasa, 2008
Dicranosepsis montana Iwasa, 1999
Dicranosepsis nigrinodosa Iwasa, 1999
Dicranosepsis notata Iwasa, 2012
Dicranosepsis olfactoria Iwasa, 1984
Dicranosepsis papuana Ozerov, 1997
Dicranosepsis parva Iwasa, 1984
Dicranosepsis planitarsis Ozerov, 1994
Dicranosepsis prominula Iwasa, 1994
Dicranosepsis pseudotibialis Ozerov, 2003
Dicranosepsis renschi Ozerov, 2003
Dicranosepsis revocans (Walker, 1860)
Dicranosepsis robusta Iwasa, 2012
Dicranosepsis sapaensis Ozerov & Krivosheina, 2011
Dicranosepsis sauteri Ozerov, 2003
Dicranosepsis sinuosa Iwasa, 2008
Dicranosepsis splendifica Iwasa, 2012
Dicranosepsis stabilis Iwasa, 1984
Dicranosepsis takoensis (Vanschuytbroeck, 1963)
Dicranosepsis thailandica Iwasa, 2012
Dicranosepsis tibialis Iwasa & Tewari, 1991
Dicranosepsis transita Ozerov, 1997
Dicranosepsis trichordis Iwasa, 1994
Dicranosepsis trochanteris Iwasa, 2012
Dicranosepsis unipilosa (Duda, 1926)
Dicranosepsis vietnamensis Iwasa, 2008

References

Sepsidae
Diptera of Asia
Diptera of Africa
Diptera of Australasia
Taxa named by Oswald Duda
Brachycera genera